Boss Cowboy is a 1934 Western B movie remake of Rough Ridin' (1924)produced and directed by low-budget independent filmmaker Victor Adamson and starring Buddy Roosevelt.

Plot 
Hard-riding ranch owner Dick Taylor hunts for a band of cattle rustlers in the Arizona ranch country.

Cast 
 Buddy Roosevelt as Dick Taylor
 Frances Morris as Mary Ross
 Sam Pierce as Tom Ross
 George Chesebro as Jack Kearns

Reception 
Rodgers reportedly received a deluge of fan mail following the film's opening run, and critics generally deemed it a success.

References

External links
 

1934 films
1934 Western (genre) films
American Western (genre) films
American black-and-white films
Films directed by Victor Adamson
1930s American films